The Classroom, Laboratory & Administration Building, commonly known simply as the CLA Building, was an administrative building on the campus of California State Polytechnic University, Pomona (Cal Poly Pomona). Designed by Albuquerque, New Mexico-based architect Antoine Predock in the Futurist style and completed in 1993, it has come to be the defining image of the university. The Administration portion of the building was demolished in August 2022 after a discovery of a fault line under the building. 

Its pointed, triangular and open top made it the most distinct tower on the university campus. According to Predock, "inevitably, human settlement alters the landscape. Successive habitation has altered the Pomona Valley from the original dry swept earth of Rancho San Jose. Now the verdant Arabian horse ranch of W.K. Kellogg coexists with the technological, superscale freeway interchange." Due to Cal Poly Pomona's proximity to the Los Angeles district of Hollywood, the building has been displayed in films such as Gattaca and Impostor, as well as several TV commercials for products such as cars and cell phones. Cal Poly Pomona changed its logo in 1994 after the opening of the building.

The CLA building sat directly above the San Jose Hills fault and had the second-highest seismic "risk score" of 72.94, in the California State University system, after a building at CSU East Bay (Warren Hall). It suffered no structural damage as a result of the July 29, 2008 Chino Hills earthquake, a magnitude 5.4. It leaked water since it was completed in 1993, and connections and beams at the building did not meet California earthquake safety standards. The University won a $13.3 million settlement after a lawsuit with the contractor who built the building. It needed so much work that university officials began contemplating tearing it down. The CSU Board of Trustees, at its September 21, 2010 meeting, approved a proposal to replace the CLA with a new facility.

All administrative offices located in the "tower" portion of the CLA were moved to the Student Services Building (SSB). The SSB (colloquially known as the "Spaceship" or the "Pringle") opened in Spring 2019 and is located directly southwest from where the CLA once stood. The Cal Poly Pomona logo was also changed in 2018 concurrent with the disuse of the CLA tower.

The removal of the Administration portion of the building, including the Registrar area began in May 2022 and was completed by the end of summer. 

The CLA site is planned to be used for green space and outdoor seating and studying areas.  The Classroom and Laboratory portions of the building are to be renovated and placed back in service, which has been controversial among some students and faculty.

References

External links

California State Polytechnic University, Pomona
Modernist architecture in California
Futurist architecture
Antoine Predock buildings
Buildings and structures in Pomona, California
1993 establishments in California
School buildings completed in 1993